Augustin Grignon (June 27, 1780 – October 2, 1860) was a fur trader and general entrepreneur in the Fox River Valley in territorial Wisconsin, surviving into its early years of statehood. He was born in Green Bay, the third of nine children of Pierre Grignon Sr., and Domitelle Langlade Grignon. (His father also had three children by an earlier marriage.) His maternal grandfather was Métis Charles Langlade, widely considered to be the "father of Wisconsin."

At the age of 25, he married Nancy McCrea, daughter of a Montreal fur trader and a Menominee woman. They had six children.

He ran his father's store in Green Bay with his brother, Pierre Jr., from the time of his father's death in 1795 until 1805 when he moved to property his wife inherited near Kaukauna. He continued in general trade, farmed, and built a flourmill and gristmill in 1821. In 1832, he was granted the first private property in Columbia County, at strategic Fort Winnebago.  In 1834 he went into semi-retirement, engaging in the fur trade at Butte des Morts. He died on October 2, 1860 at Butte des Morts.

References

American fur traders
American Métis people
People from Green Bay, Wisconsin
Businesspeople from Wisconsin
1780 births
1860 deaths
19th-century American businesspeople